William Gerald Brown AM (11 January 195213 January 2013) professionally known  as Billie Brown was an Australian stage, film and television actor and acclaimed playwright.

Early life
Brown was born in Biloela, Queensland and studied drama at the University of Queensland. He began his career in the early 1970s at Queensland Theatre Company, working alongside Geoffrey Rush. He was openly gay.

Abroad 
Brown's career took him abroad to Britain, where he joined the Royal Shakespeare Company (RSC), and was the first Australian commissioned to write and perform in their own play – The Swan Down Gloves. The show opened at the Barbican Theatre (RSC's home theatre from 1982 to 2002) and had a Royal Command Performance.  As a member of the RSC (between 1976 and 1982, 1986–88 and 1994–96) Brown toured with their productions throughout Europe, playing Paris, Vienna, Berlin and Munich.  He also appeared in the RSC's premiere production of The Wizard of Oz in the gender-bending roles of The Wicked Witch of the West and Miss Gulch, for which he was nominated for an Olivier Award in 1988.

While working in the United Kingdom, Brown also performed in the West End, at the Aldwych and Haymarket Theatres, the Chichester Festival Theatre, English National Opera and Dublin Theatre Festival. While performing onstage at Stratford he was spotted by John Cleese, who cast him in Fierce Creatures, the sequel to A Fish Called Wanda.

In New York, Brown made his Broadway debut as an actor in 1986 in Michael Frayn's Wild Honey with Ian McKellen, directed by Christopher Morahan, and as a playwright with his adaptation of a benefit performance of A Christmas Carol in 1985, featuring Helen Hayes, Len Cariou as Scrooge, MacIntyre Dixon, Celeste Holm, Raúl Juliá, Mary Elizabeth Mastrantonio, Harold Scott, Carole Shelley, and Fritz Weaver, directed by W. Stuart McDowell. He was also an Artist-in-residence at the State University of New York in 1982.

Bille Brown was a visiting professor at the State University of New York at New Paltz.

Australia 
Brown returned to Australia to live permanently in 1996. He had an outstanding career on stage and performed for many leading Australian theatre companies, including Queensland Theatre Company, Sydney Theatre Company, Bell Shakespeare Company, Malthouse Theatre, Melbourne Theatre Company, Company B, State Theatre Company of South Australia, Marian St Theatre, La Boite and the Old Tote Theatre at the Sydney Opera House.

In 1996, he directed the Australian stage production of Hugh Lunn's Over the Top with Jim, which exceeded box office expectations. He had huge success with his role as Count Almaviva in Beaumarchais' The Marriage of Figaro, with Geoffrey Rush, which opened the new Playhouse in Brisbane in September 1998. In 1999 he also had major success in Sydney and subsequently throughout Australia as Oscar Wilde in the Belvoir St production of David Hare's The Judas Kiss.

The same year he accepted an offer to be Adjunct Professor in the School of English, Media Studies and Art History at the University of Queensland, and gave workshops and master classes for drama students.

In 2009, Brown wrote and performed in Queensland Theatre Company's The School of Arts. The play follows the story of the old 'College Players' who toured Shakespeare through Queensland in the late 1960s.

His playwriting credits include Bill and Mary, based on imaginary conversations between the poet Mary Gilmore and the portrait painter William Dobell while she was sitting for him.

Film
Brown appeared in films including Fierce Creatures (as "Neville"), The Dish (as "the Prime Minister"), Oscar and Lucinda (as "Percy Smith") and Singularity.

Honours
Brown was appointed a Member of the Order of Australia (AM) in the Australia Day Honours 2011.

Awards
Brown received an Honorary Doctorate of Letters from the University of Queensland.

Death
Brown died from bowel cancer on 13 January 2013, two days after his 61st birthday. After a private funeral, a public memorial service was held at the Queensland Performing Arts Centre on 4 February 2013. The eulogy was delivered by longtime friend and colleague Geoffrey Rush.

Film credits 
 Fierce Creatures (1997) - Neville Coltrane
 Oscar and Lucinda (1997) - Percy Smith
 Passion (1999) - John Grainger
 Walk the Talk (2000) - Barry
 The Dish (2000) - Prime Minister
 Serenades (2001) - Pastor Hoffman
 The Man Who Sued God (2001) - Gerry Ryan
 Black and White (2002) - Sir Thomas Playford
 Dirty Deeds (2002) - Senator
 Curtin (2007) - Robert Menzies
 Unfinished Sky (2007) - Bob Potter
 Dying Breed (2008) - Harvey / Rowan
 At World's End (2009) - James Hall
 The Chronicles of Narnia: The Voyage of the Dawn Treader (2010) - Coriakin
 The Eye of the Storm (2011) - Dudley
 Killer Elite (2011) - Colonel Fitz
 Singularity (2013) - Egerton (final film role)

Television credits 
 Medivac (1997) - Prosecutor
 A Difficult Woman (1998) - Howard
 Big Sky (1999) - Lightfoot
 The Young Indiana Jones Chronicles (1999) - Hinkel
 The Farm (2001) - Booth
 Bad Cop, Bad Cop (2002) - Detective 'Blue' Wales
 White Collar Blue (2003) - Tony Heron
 Blackjack (2005) - Tez Miller
 The Hollowmen (2008) - Senator Ron Engels
 All Saints (2000-2009) - Steve Coulter / Bill Lewis
 Heartbeat (2009) - Sergeant Flaherty
 3 Acts of Murder (2009) - George Ritchie
 Wild Boys (2011) - Booth
 Miss Fisher's Murder Mysteries (2012) - Bart Tarrant
 The Kennedys
 Rake (2012) - Dominic Rose

References

External links

 Alyce Faye Cleese interviews Bille Brown in Montecito, Ca. 35 minutes.
 Bille Brown – Stage acting credits
 "Merry Wives of Windsor" – special Waratah Festival performance, at Albert Park Amphitheatre, Brisbane (1987)
 "The Merry Wives of Windsor" – Albert Park Amphitheatre, Brisbane (1987)

1952 births
2013 deaths
Australian male dramatists and playwrights
Australian male film actors
Australian male stage actors
Australian male television actors
Australian theatre directors
Australian expatriates in the United Kingdom
Australian gay actors
LGBT theatre directors
Australian LGBT dramatists and playwrights
Helpmann Award winners
Members of the Order of Australia
University of Queensland alumni
People from Biloela
Deaths from colorectal cancer
Deaths from cancer in Queensland
20th-century Australian dramatists and playwrights
21st-century Australian dramatists and playwrights
21st-century Australian LGBT people